The third season of the American reality competition television series Lego Masters premiered on Fox on September 21, 2022. It ended on December 14, 2022 with influencers Nick & Stacey being crowned the winning team, defeating firefighters Stephen & Stephen and siblings Dave & Emily.

The series is based on the British series of the same name. On December 14, 2022, the series was renewed for a fourth season.

Host and judges 
Host Will Arnett and judges Jamie Berard and Amy Corbett returned from the previous seasons. Guests throughout the season included Chris Pratt accompanied by Blue during the second episode, and NASCAR racers William Byron and Jeff Gordon in the eleventh episode.

Production 
Alongside the renewal in December 2021, it was announced that Will Arnett would return to host. The season was originally slated to premiere on May 31, 2022, but was later pushed to the 2022–23 season. On June 6, 2022, it was announced that the third season will premiere on September 21, 2022.

Elimination table 

†Team awarded the Golden Brick.

Episodes

Ratings

Notes

References 

2022 American television seasons